George Temple was a mathematician.

George Temple may also refer to:
George Temple (priest) (1933–2003), Archdeacon of Bodmin
George Arthur Temple (1887–?), English footballer
George Temple, character in Key Largo

See also
George Temple-Poole (1856–1934), British architect and public servant